Neoholothele is a genus of tarantula, first described in 2015 by Guadanucci & Weinmann. , it contains 2 species Neoholothele fasciaaurinigra and Neoholothele incei, the latter being the type species. They are named after the prefix "neo" from the greek word for new, and the genus Holothele.

Diagnosis 
They can be distinguished by the coloration of the carapace, which is dark with a golden cephalic region. Females with a striped pattern on the abdomen, with a long and slender spermathecae receptors. Males with a retrolateral branch in the male tibial spurs with an apical end.

References

Theraphosidae
Theraphosidae genera